Christopher James Pearce (born 19 April 1984) is an English cricketer.  Pearce is a right-handed batsman who bowls leg break. He was born in Wolverhampton, England.

Pearce represented the Worcestershire Cricket Board in a single List A match against Worcestershire in the 2003 Cheltenham & Gloucester Trophy.  In his only List A match, he scored 5 runs and took a single catch in the field.

References

External links
Christopher Pearce at Cricinfo
Christopher Pearce at CricketArchive

1984 births
Living people
Cricketers from Wolverhampton
English cricketers
Worcestershire Cricket Board cricketers
Alumni of Durham University